Oliver Frazer (1808 – April 9, 1864) was an American portrait painter. He was trained by Matthew Harris Jouett before going to Europe, and he became a portrait painter in his home state of Kentucky. He did portraits of many notable Kentuckians like James G. Birney, Edward Morton Le Grand, Colonel William Robertson McKee, and Richard Menefee. His portrait of Henry Clay is in the permanent collection of the Metropolitan Museum of Art. His papers are held at the University of Kentucky Libraries Special Collections Research Center.

Further reading

References

1808 births
1864 deaths
Painters from Kentucky
American male painters
American portrait painters
19th-century American painters
19th-century American male artists